Dumeng Giovanoli (born 23 January 1941) is a former Swiss alpine skier. In 1968, Giovanoli won the World Cup in Slalom. He also competed at the alpine skiing events at the 1964 and 1968 Winter Olympics.

References

External links
 

1941 births
Living people
Swiss male alpine skiers
Alpine skiers at the 1964 Winter Olympics
Alpine skiers at the 1968 Winter Olympics
FIS Alpine Ski World Cup champions
Olympic alpine skiers of Switzerland